László Hidvégi (5 November 1916 – 15 January 2003) was a Hungarian diver. He was born in Budapest. He competed at the 1936 Summer Olympics in Berlin, where he placed 18th in 10 metre platform, and 18th in springboard.

References

External links

1916 births
2003 deaths
Divers from Budapest
Hungarian male divers
Olympic divers of Hungary
Divers at the 1936 Summer Olympics
Sportspeople from Budapest